The Hegel Society of America (HSA) was founded in 1968 at the Wofford Symposium in Spartanburg, South Carolina, United States.  Its mission is to promote the study of the philosophy of Georg Wilhelm Friedrich Hegel, but it never endorses or promotes any particular way of interpreting Hegel.

These studies include Hegel's place in the history of philosophy, as well as the relationships of Hegel's writings to social, political, and cultural movements within the 19th, 20th and 21st centuries.  The HSA claims that Hegel's philosophy remains relevant to contemporary issues and fields of knowledge.

HSA members meet every two years for three-day seminars.  These meetings feature a program on a theme selected by a democratic vote at the previous meeting, and the proceedings of every meeting since 1982 have been published.

Cooperation
HSA scholars cooperate with scholars from the following institutions:

Hegel Society of Great Britain
The Internationale Hegel-Vereinigung
The Internationale Hegel-Gesellschaft 
The Centre de recherche et de documentation sur Hegel
The Hegel-Archiv at Ruhr Universität, Bochum, Germany

Official journal
The HSA official journal, The Owl of Minerva, is published twice yearly in Spring and Fall issues. Since 1969, the Owl has published approximately 1,000 articles, reviews, discussions, translations, and bibliographic information about current scholarship within Hegel studies.

All members of the Hegel Society of America receives a print subscription to the Owl, and print or electronic versions are distributed to more than 180 libraries worldwide. Memberships, and distribution of the journal in print and electronic formats, are managed by the Philosophy Documentation Center.

External links

 The Owl of Minerva
 Philosophy Documentation Center

Organizations established in 1968
Philosophical societies in the United States
Georg Wilhelm Friedrich Hegel
1968 establishments in South Carolina